Annibale Annibaldi, also known as Annibaldo degli Annibaldi, (died 1 September 1271) was an Italian Catholic theologian,

Early biography
Annibile was born into  the Roman baronial family known as the Annibaldi, early in the 13th century.

Formation
Annibaldi joined the Dominican Order at an early age.  He was an alumnus of Santa Sabina studium conventuale, the first studium of the Dominican Order at Rome, and the progenitor of the Pontifical University of Saint Thomas Aquinas, Angelicum.  Later he was sent to the studium generale at Paris c. 1255 to become a master.

Career

At Paris Annibaldi formed an intimate friendship with St. Thomas Aquinas and succeeded him as regent of studies at the Convent of St. Jacques. After teaching in Paris for some years, he was called to Rome in 1246 by Innocent IV to fill the post of Master of the Sacred Palace. He served in this capacity under Popes Alexander IV and Urban IV, the latter of whom created him Cardinal in 1262. When Clement IV, in 1265, handed over the Kingdom of the Two Sicilies to Charles I of Anjou, Annibale was put at the head of the commission empowered to treat with the monarch and register his agreement to the papal stipulations. The King received the insignia of investiture in Rome from the hands of the Cardinal. On 6 January 1266, Annibale anointed and solemnly crowned Charles I in the Lateran Church in Rome, the Pope being detained in Perugia. During the vacancy succeeding the death of Clement IV, Annibale received and treated with Philip III of France and Charles I at Viterbo (1270). During a papal mission at Orvieto, the Cardinal died, and, by his own request, was buried in the Church of San Domenico.

He was held in high esteem during life for his learning and virtues. Aquinas dedicated his Catena Aurea to him. Annibale, besides several small theological treatises now lost, wrote a commentary on the "Sentences", and "Quod libeta", which has been ascribed to St. Thomas, and published with his works even as recently as the Paris edition of 1889, by Frette. A manuscript in the Carmelite monastery in Paris calls Annibale a Carmelite who later became a Cistercian abbot. But Jacques Echard shows that no man of that name belonged to either order in the twelfth or thirteenth century.

References

Attribution
 Cites:
Quétif and Échard, SS. Ord. Praed., I, 261;
Touron, Hommes illustres de l'ordre de Saint Dominique, I, 262-269;
Eubel, Hierarchia Catholica, I, 8;
Cattalani, De Magistro Sacri Palatii Apostolici (Rome, 1751), 57-59;
Duchesne, Histoire de tous les cardinaux français de naissance (Paris, 1699), II, 277, 278;
Masetti, Monumenta Ordinis Praedicatorum Antiqua (Rome, 1864), I, 301;
Feret, La faculté de théologie de Paris au moyen âge, II, 550, 553.

13th-century births
1271 deaths
Writers from Rome
13th-century Italian Roman Catholic theologians
Italian Dominicans
13th-century Italian writers
13th-century Latin writers